Abraham Tesser'  (born May 24, 1941, Brooklyn, NY) is Distinguished Research Professor Emeritus of Psychology at the University of Georgia. His research has made significant contributions to several areas in the field of Social Psychology. He created the self-evaluation maintenance model, a theory in social psychology that focuses on the motives for self-enhancement.

Biography
Abraham Tesser received a BA from Long Island University in 1962 and an MS in 1965 and PhD in 1967 from Purdue University. He is now a Distinguished Research Professor Emeritus from the University of Georgia where he held a faculty position (1967-1999) and directed the Institute for Behavioral Research (1984-1994). His research has been supported by the National Science Foundation and the National Institute for Mental Health. He served in the field of social psychology as president in 2000 of the Society for Personality and Social Psychology and as Editor of the Journal of Personality and Social Psychology. His major research contributions have been in the areas of interpersonal communication, attitudes and the psychology of self.

Research

Interpersonal Communication: The Mum Effect
This research, in collaboration with Sidney Rosen, identified (and named) a robust tendency for persons to avoid communicating information with negative consequences (bad news) to the relevant recipient. A variety of explanations for the effect has been explored and reported.

Attitudes
Self-Generated attitude change (attitude polarization). This research  suggests that simply thinking about an attitude object, even with no new information or change in circumstances, can result in attitude change usually in a more extreme direction (polarization). Such changes seem to depend on the presence of cognitive schemas. 
Attitudes and Behavior. The Mismatch Model. Self-reported attitudes might primarily reflect a person's feelings or her beliefs about an attitude object Her behavior with respect to the object might also primarily reflect feelings about the object, i.e., consummatory behaviors, or beliefs about the object, i.e., instrumental behaviors. According to the Mismatch Model the relationship between attitudes and behavior is maximized when there is a match between the attitude component reflected in the self-report and the component reflected in the behavior.
Attitude Heritability. Attitudes differ in the extent to which they are influenced by genetic factors, i.e., their heritability. Attitudes with greater heritability are more accessible, more resistant to social influence and more influential in attracting/repelling us to/from others.

The Psychology of Self
The Self-evaluation maintenance theory  posits two processes, the comparison process and the reflection process, to explain how the outstanding performance of others can affect our own behavior. When a close other, e.g., a friend or relative, performs better in a highly self-relevant domain then self-evaluation is likely to suffer by comparison. If the performance domain is low in self-relevance then the reflection process is likely to be more important and the outstanding performance of a friend or relative boost self-evaluation. Assume that people want to maintain a positive self-evaluation. Now, predictions can be tested about when people will alter the self-relevance of a performance domain, how close (or distant) they will feel toward another, and whether they will facilitate or hinder the performance of another. The emotions underlying these behavioral changes have also been explored. The model has been extended to recognize the effects of committed relationships, e.g., marriage, by Stephen Beach.
Confluence and the Self Zoo. The number of processes that affect self-esteem is large and diverse, a "self zoo" . Using three broad classes of mechanisms, cognitive consistency, social comparison and value expression, the "confluence" work shows that many of these mechanisms are not independent. For example, a threat to self-esteem via social comparison can be addressed via increases in cognitive consistency or value expression and vice versa

References

Living people
American social psychologists
University of Georgia faculty
1941 births